Olearia ericoides is a species of flowering plant in the family Asteraceae and is endemic to Tasmania. It is a slender shrub with oblong leaves and white and yellow, daisy-like inflorescences.

Description
Olearia ericoides is a slender, small to medium-sized, glabrous shrub. The heads or daisy-like "flowers" are arranged singly on the ends of long and short branchlets and are sessile. The fruit is a reddish achene with rigid bristles.

Taxonomy
This species was first formally described in 1856 by Joachim Steetz who gave it the name Eurybia ericoides in Johann Georg Christian Lehmann's Plantae Preissianae from specimens collected by Theodor Siemssen near Hobart in 1837.

In 1956, Norman Wakefield changed the name to Olearia ericoides in The Victorian Naturalist.

The specific epithet (ericoides) means "Erica-like".

Distribution and habitat
Olearia ericoides grows on dry hillsides in the south and south-east of Tasmania.

References

ericoides
Flora of Tasmania
Plants described in 1845
Taxa named by Joachim Steetz